Benito Eremasilevu (born October 7, 1989) in Savusavu, Cakaudrove is a Fijian rugby union footballer. He plays wing for Fiji and French Top 14 side, Brive.

Career
Masilevu was born in Savusavu, he attended St Bedes Primary school. He later moved to Suva and attended Marist Brothers High School. After finishing High school, he joined the Fiji National University and completed his diploma in teaching.

He started playing 7's rugby and soon he was spotted by Fiji sevens assistant coach, Etuate Waqa, who included him in his squad. He made his debut in the 2013 Gold Coast Sevens where he scored 6 tries. He finished the 2013–14 IRB Sevens World Series with 27 tries and 2nd highest try scorer overall behind another Fijian winger, Samisoni Viriviri.

His strong performance on the sevens circuit caught the eye of CA Brive head coach, Nicolas Godignon who signed him up. He joined other Fijian players in the squad including, Sisaro Koyamaibole, Dominiko Waqaniburotu and Malakai Radikedike.

In September 2014, he made news headlines when he beat Toulouse winger, Gaël Fickou for dead with a giant sidestep to score a match winning try. A few days later, Masilevu extended his 1-year contract until 2018.
 
On 11 July 2015, he made his debut for the Flying Fijians starting on the wing in a 26–27 loss to the Māori All Blacks in Suva.

References

External links
 
 
 Benito Masilevu at ItsRugby 
 Benito Masilevu at LNR 
 

1989 births
Living people
People from Savusavu
Fijian rugby union players
Fiji international rugby union players
Fijian expatriate rugby union players
Expatriate rugby union players in France
Male rugby sevens players
Rugby union wings
Fijian expatriate sportspeople in France
CA Brive players
Fiji National University alumni
People educated at Marist Brothers High School, Fiji